Orchard Lake may refer to:

Orchard Lake (Michigan), a lake in Oakland County
Orchard Lake (Minnesota), a lake in Dakota County
Orchard Lake Village, Michigan,  a city in Oakland County